One More Time is a studio album by Kay Starr. It was released in 1960 by Capitol Records (catalog no. T-1358).

Upon the album's release, Billboard magazine gave it the highest rating of four stars and wrote: "Miss Starr is in fine, vibrant vocal form on a group of nostalgic standards and oldies. Selections -- all first-rate jockey material -- reflecting a flock of moods."

AllMusic later gave the album a rating of two stars.

Track listing
Side A
 "Side by Side"
 "So Tired"
 "I'm the Lonesomest Gal in Town"
 "Changing Partners"
 "Fortunes in Dreams"
 "Swamp Fire"

Side B
 "I'll Always Be in Love with You"
 "Two Brothers"
 "The Breeze"
 "Noah!"
 "Hold Me, Hold Me, Hold Me"
 "Kay's Lament"

References

1960 albums
Kay Starr albums
Capitol Records albums